Otto Wegener (3 February 1881 – 2 April 1938) was a Danish sports shooter. He competed in three events at the 1920 Summer Olympics.

References

External links
 

1881 births
1938 deaths
Danish male sport shooters
Olympic shooters of Denmark
Shooters at the 1920 Summer Olympics
People from Skanderborg Municipality
Sportspeople from the Central Denmark Region